The second season of American Dad! aired from September 11, 2005, to May 14, 2006. The season consisted of sixteen episodes. The first 6 episodes of the season is included within the Volume 1 DVD box set, which was released on April 25, 2006.


Episode list

References
General
 

Specific

External links

 
2005 American television seasons
2006 American television seasons